Home Sweet Home is an American reality social experiment television series, created by Ava DuVernay. In each episode, two families swap homes for a week to learn about the other family's experience. The series premiered on October 15, 2021, on NBC, before being pulled off the schedule on November 9, after four episodes. The series moved to Peacock on November 12, 2021.

Production
On July 16, 2020, it was announced that NBC had ordered the series with Ava DuVernay, Sarah Bremner and Paul Garnes as the executive producers. On August 19, 2021, it was announced that Bremner left the series. It was also announced that the series would premiere on October 15, 2021.

Episodes

Reception

Critical response
Angie Han, writing for The Hollywood Reporter, wrote of the series that "while Home Sweet Home can’t quite manage to fix all the prejudices and misunderstandings that ail modern society, it’s at least an agreeable reminder that it doesn’t hurt to try," and that it "[sees] its purpose as bridging the gaps between people from different walks of life," and concluded that, compared to other reality shows that might have been framed as mean-spirited, Home Sweet Home stays firmly on the side of nice.

Ratings

Notes

References

External links

2020s American reality television series
2021 American television series debuts
2021 American television series endings
English-language television shows
NBC original programming
Peacock (streaming service) original programming
Television series about families
Television series by Warner Horizon Television